The 2009 Tokyo Marathon was the third edition of the annual marathon race in Tokyo, Japan and was held on Sunday, 22 March. The men's race was won by Kenya's Salim Kipsang in a time of 2:10:27, while the women's race was won by home athlete Mizuho Nasukawa in 2:25:38.

Results

Men

Women

References

 Results. Association of Road Racing Statisticians. Retrieved 2020-04-05.

External links

 Official website

Tokyo Marathon
Tokyo
2009 in Tokyo
Tokyo Marathon
Tokyo Marathon